Zellio Louis Peter Toppazzini (January 5, 1930 – April 1, 2001) was a Canadian professional ice hockey player who played 123 games in the National Hockey League with the Boston Bruins, New York Rangers, and Chicago Black Hawks between 1949 and 1956. The rest of his career, which lasted from 1948 to 1964, was mainly spent with the Providence Reds of the American Hockey League. After He was the brother of Jerry Toppazzini, who played in the NHL from 1952 to 1964, and the great-uncle of Justin Williams, who played in the NHL from 2000 to 2020.

Playing career
Toppazzini spent most of his career with the American Hockey League's Providence Reds. Nicknamed "Topper", Toppazzini is the all-time leading scorer in Reds history. During his 12 years with the Reds, from 1951 to 1964, he amassed 279 goals, 448 assists and 727 points in 650 regular season games, and another 16–28–44 in playoff action. All are team records.

In 1955–56 the line of Toppazzini, Paul Larivee and Camille Henry spearheaded the Reds to both regular season and Calder Cup championships. Toppazzini earned career highs of 42 goals, 71 assists and 113 points in leading the AHL in scoring and in the playoffs he also added 7–13–20.

Post-playing career
In 2000, The Rhode Island Reds Heritage Society named Toppazzini its "Player of the Century"; it presents an annual award in his honor. In 2012, Zellio was inducted into the AHL Hall of Fame.

Toppazzini coached the Providence College hockey team for four seasons from 1964–65 through 1967–68 compiling a 31–60–1 (0.342) record. His best and only winning season behind the PC bench was his first year (1964–65) when the Friars went 14–11–1 (0.558). Toppazzini was replaced by Lou Lamoriello.

Toppazzini was inducted as a charter member of the Rhode Island Hockey Hall of Fame in 2018.

Career statistics

Regular season and playoffs

Head coaching record

References

External links
 

1930 births
2001 deaths
Boston Bruins players
Canadian ice hockey right wingers
Canadian people of Italian descent
Chicago Blackhawks players
Hershey Bears players
Ice hockey people from Ontario
New York Rangers players
Providence Reds players
St. Catharines Teepees players
Sportspeople from Greater Sudbury